The European University Institute (EUI) is an international postgraduate and post-doctoral teaching and research institute and an independent body of the European Union with juridical personality, established by the member states to contribute to cultural and scientific development in the social sciences, in a European perspective. EUI is designated as an international organisation. It is located in the hills above Florence in Fiesole, Italy. In 2021, EUI's School of Transnational Governance, with its flagship graduate and executive programmes, moved to the Casino Mediceo di San Marco, which is a late-Renaissance or Mannerist style palace in the historic centre of Florence.

History and member states
The European University Institute (EUI) was founded in 1972 by the member states of the European Community.

The EUI finds its origins in the advocacy for a European institute at the 1948 Hague Conference and the European Cultural Conference the following year. At the 1955 Messina Conference, when the members of the European Coal and Steel Community (ECSC) gathered to assess that organisation's progress, the German secretary of state, Walter Hallstein, called for the establishment of a training centre for nuclear sciences.

The idea remained largely dormant until 1969 when European leaders met in The Hague and resolved to fund a European University Institute (EUI) in Florence. By this point the idea had evolved from a centre for nuclear sciences to one focused on the human sciences, promoting a cultural exchange between member states.

Plans were put into motion with conferences in Florence and Rome in 1970 and 1971, when it was decided that the institute would be reserved for post-graduate studies and not directly a Community institution.

The six member states – Belgium, France, Germany, Italy, Luxembourg and the Netherlands – signed a convention in 1972 establishing the EUI as a pillar for research and development. The EUI Convention entered into force in 1975, and the institute opened its doors to its first 70 researchers in 1976. Its mission, laid down in the 1970s, is to "foster the advancement of learning in fields which are of particular interest for the development of Europe".

Denmark, Ireland and the United Kingdom joined the European Community in 1973, and subsequently acceded to the convention establishing the EUI. In 1992, a new convention revising the 1972 convention establishing the EUI was signed by the then 12 Community member states. It entered into force in 2007 when the last contracting state ratified the convention.

, the EUI member states are:

 Austria
 Belgium
 Bulgaria
 Cyprus
 Denmark
 Estonia
 Finland
 France
 Germany
 Greece
 Ireland
 Italy
 Latvia
 Luxembourg
 Malta
 Netherlands
 Poland
 Portugal
 Romania
 Slovakia
 Slovenia
 Spain
 Sweden
 United Kingdom

The remaining EU member states which are not EUI member states are: Croatia, Czech Republic, Hungary, and Lithuania.

Departments and centres

Department of Economics
The Economics Department provides teaching and supervision to PhD students. The research activities of the department reflect the interests of the faculty and are concentrated in micro, macro and econometrics. Weekly research seminars are given by scholars from around the world. The teaching in the doctoral programme is based on formal coursework at a level which will allow researchers to pursue academic careers in universities or to follow professional opportunities in international organisations. In their third and fourth years researchers work on their thesis projects under the guidance of their supervisor while attending research workshops and seminars.

Department of History and Civilisation
The Department of History and Civilisation (HEC) offers a programme of transnational and comparative European history. The doctoral programme studies the construction of Europe's boundaries and the diversity and complexity of experiences within them.

The department's central concerns are the interlinking of European societies since the Renaissance and the complex cultural legacies that have shaped contemporary Europe. The HEC community is also committed to exploring the place of Europe in the world through the study of empires, global processes and institutions.

The variety of research approaches and themes, as well as the broad background of its professors, enable the department to recruit high-quality Ph.D. candidates and to host outstanding research fellows.

Department of Law
The Department of Law is European and international in character. It is committed to the study of law in a comparative and contextual manner, with a special focus on European and international law.

Courses and seminars are interactive, research-oriented and designed to cover the main subject areas of the department's work. Researchers gain experience in presenting their work, and are encouraged to participate in conferences, workshops and the department's working groups.

Within the department, the Academy of European Law (AEL) offers advanced-level summer courses in Human Rights Law and EU Law. It also manages research projects and runs a publications programme.

The EUI Law Department also jointly hosts, with Harvard Law School, the Summer School on Law and Logic. This summer school was launched in 2012 and is also sponsored by CIRSFID-University of Bologna (Italy), the University of Groningen (the Netherlands), the European Academy of Legal Theory, and a grant from the Erasmus Lifelong Learning Programme.

Department of Political and Social Sciences
The research programme of the Department of Political and Social Sciences (SPS) places emphasis on political and social change within Europe at the national, sub-national and transnational level.
The research interests of the department range across the four sub-disciplines of comparative politics, sociology, international relations, and social and political theory.

Courses in both quantitative and qualitative methods are available as options in the first and second year, while field work and data collection normally take place in the second and third year.

School of Transnational Governance
The School of Transnational Governance was launched in 2017. The School is concerned with problems of governance beyond the state, and offers Executive Training seminars, high-level policy dialogues, fellowships, and a masters programme in transnational governance. It is supported by the Erasmus+ programme of the European Commission.

Robert Schuman Centre for Advanced Studies
The Robert Schuman Centre for Advanced Studies was launched by the European University Institute in 1993 building up on the experience of an already existing Policy Unit, created by Joseph Weiler. It is named for Robert Schuman. The initial set up was rather modest: one director, one assistant and two secretaries, but over the years the centre has grown into a large research centre pursuing interdisciplinary research into the key political challenges facing Europe and the EU today and bringing together academics and practitioners, in both policy dialogues and executive training. The centre's mission is to “contribute to research on the major issues facing contemporary European society, including questions associated with the construction of Europe.”
The centre has several main programmes.

Global Governance Programme
The Global Governance Programme brings together academics, diplomats, public officers and officials from international organisations to connect the worlds of research and policy-making. It tackles a wide range of issues, including human rights, international trade, development, climate change, internet governance and regional integration.

The programme hosts a series of events, including High-Level Policy Seminars, where participants can exchange ideas.

Florence School of Regulation
The Florence School of Regulation (FSR) is a centre of excellence for independent research, training and policy dialogue. The FSR has been founded in 2004 as a partnership between the EUI's Robert Schuman Centre for Advanced Studies, the Council of the European Energy Regulators (CEER) and the Independent Regulators Group (IRG). The school also works closely with the European Commission.

The FSR organises policy events dealing with key regulatory issues, provides academic training for practitioners, produces regulation research and promotes networking and the exchange of ideas in the areas of:

 Energy and Climate
 Communications and Media
 Transport
 Water

Policy and business decision-makers, regulators, regulated companies and academics from different countries are encouraged to share their experiences through the school.

European Governance and Politics Programme
The European Governance and Politics Programme (EGPP) is an international hub of theoretical and empirical academic research on Europe's politics and governance. The programme is committed to combining solid theoretical foundations to analyse the interaction between European integration and national politics with rigorous empirical analysis based on extensive data collection. Launched in 2018, EGPP was established as the successor programme to the European Union Democracy Observatory (EUDO), active between 2006 and 2016. In 2020, Daniele Caramani took over the directorship of EGPP from Brigid Laffan, who was founding director from 2018 until 2020.

Migration Policy Centre
The Migration Policy Centre has been founded in January 2012 and conducts advanced policy-oriented research on global migration, asylum and mobility. It serves governance needs at European and global levels, from developing, implementing and monitoring migration-related policies to assessing their impact on the wider economy and society.

Centre for Media Pluralism and Media Freedom
The Centre for Media Pluralism and Media Freedom (CMPF) was set up to raise awareness of media diversity and freedom issues in Europe. Co-financed by the European Union, it is composed of experts in legal studies, new media policies, media markets and economics, political science and political communications. 
Through its programme of research, debate, training and dissemination of results, the CMPF works with academics, policy makers, regulators, market stakeholders, journalists and others interested in the debate.

Middle East Directions Programme

The Middle East Directions Programme (MEDirections) is a research programme that promotes multidisciplinary research on the Middle East and North Africa to address turbulent changes in the region that profoundly impact its peoples and cause repercussions for Europe. Based on fieldwork findings and collaboration with researchers from the region, MEDirections seeks the new paradigms and the new research focus that are needed to analyse the region and its on-going transformations to better guide policy-making.

Historical Archives of the EU 
The Historical Archives of the European Union (HAEU) preserve and make accessible the documents produced by the European Union's institutions according to the thirty-year rule governing public access to archival material. The HAEU were established following decisions of the European Coal and Steel Community (ECSC) and the Council in 1983 to open their historical archives to the public. An agreement between the European Commission and the European University Institute in 1984 led to the creation of the HAEU. The Archives are administered by the EUI and are operative in Florence since 1986.

Doctoral and master programmes

Doctoral Programme

The EUI prepares researchers for developing and defending a doctoral thesis in the fields of economics, history and civilization, law, and political and social sciences. Around 150-160 research grants are awarded annually by the EU Member States and other European national authorities to successful candidates. A Ph.D. from the European University Institute is an internationally recognised qualification.

While each department structures its own four-year programme, in all researchers are involved in seminars and other events where they are encouraged to participate and present their work. During their Ph.D. students may travel within the EU and further afield to conduct research, while there are also exchange opportunities.

Grants and fees
There are funding options available to researchers, with the majority of EU member states offering grants which cover living costs and tuition fees. There are additional agreements with non-EU member states, while the Italian and Spanish ministries of foreign affairs provide grants to a number of countries. Academics not covered by grants pay €12,000 each year in tuition fees and be able to guarantee at least €1,200 monthly to cover living costs, although fees may be reduced or waived for candidates from developing countries.

For all persons except for PhD and LLM researchers, grants or salaries are paid by the EUI. These persons – trainees, administrative staff, Fellows and Professors – are paid equally. By contrast, PhD and LLM researchers' grants are determined (and generally paid) directly by the Member States. Whilst the EUI Convention's Declarations says that States should aim for grants to be 'comparable', there is wide variation in grants. This is in addition to wide variation in conditions (such as healthcare, parental leave and other grants). Additionally, whilst the EUI pays the same grant to all fourth-year PhD researchers (€1,365, the amount it estimates as necessary to live in Florence), several States top this up.

As of 2020/21, the basic grant/salaries (and top-ups) stood as follows:

Masters Programme in Law

Since 1984 the European University Institute has offered law students a one-year programme leading to the degree of Master in Comparative, European and International Law (LL.M. degree level).

Languages
The majority of students and professors are multilingual; all are required to have a good knowledge of English although French and Italian are also regular working languages and the institute is committed to accommodating other languages where possible.

Postdoctoral fellowships
The EUI has several post-doctoral fellowships in the social sciences

Max Weber Postdoctoral Fellowships
The Max Weber Programme is Europe's largest postdoctoral programme in the social sciences and is funded by the European Commission.

Max Weber Fellowships are designed for junior post-docs who would like to pursue an academic career, concentrate on their own research and enhance their academic practice in a multidisciplinary environment. Max Weber Fellowships are for one or two years and are open to candidates who have received a doctorate in the social sciences (economics, law, political science, sociology, history and related fields) within the last five years.

Jean Monnet Fellowships
Through its Jean Monnet Fellowship Programme the Robert Schuman Centre for Advanced Studies offers fellowships to mid- and late-career scholars (while previously the Jean Monnet was a post-doctoral fellowship, it is now available only to those who received their PhD at least five years prior). During their stay at the RSCAS, fellows work on a research topic that fits well in the overall research profile of the RSCAS and participate in the academic life of the centre and of the EUI. Jean Monnet Fellowships have a duration of one or two years and are open to candidates who have received a doctorate more than five years prior.

Fernand Braudel Senior Fellowships
Fernand Braudel Senior Fellowships provide a framework for established academics with an international reputation to pursue their research at the EUI. Fellowships last for up to ten months in one of the EUI's four Departments which in turn invite fellows to participate in departmental activities (seminars, workshops, colloquia, etc.).

Marie Curie Fellowships
The EUI (the departments and the Robert Schuman Centre for Advanced Studies) acts as a host institution for Marie Curie Fellowships which are awarded by the European Commission.

Canon Foundation Fellowships
The Canon Foundation and the EUI jointly award one Canon Foundation Fellowship each year for post-doctoral research at the EUI. The fellowship is open to candidates of Japanese nationality or permanent residents of Japan.

Academy of Finland Fellowships
The Academy of Finland awards fellowships for post-doctoral research at the EUI. A project to be funded shall serve Finnish research and society or international collaboration.

Australian European University Institute Fellowships Association Inc
The Australian European University Institute Fellowships Association Inc awards annually one six-month Postdoctoral Fellowship for the period January–June. The Postdoctoral Fellowship is available to those who have graduated with a PhD qualification within the last five years, and is open only to Australian citizens or residents employed in Australian universities.

Major Events

The State of the Union
The State of the Union is an annual forum for high level reflection on the European Union organised by the EUI since 2011.  The conference acts as a bridge between academia and policy making at the highest level in Europe, bringing together heads of state, EU representatives, academics, policy-makers, business and opinion leaders and civil society representatives to discuss and debate the key challenges and opportunities facing Europe and Europeans each year. Presidents, prime ministers, foreign ministers, as well as presidents of the European Commission and European Parliament have taken part in the event over the years.

Rankings
The EUI is one of the leading social science research institutions in Europe, and with around 1,000 researchers at various levels in their careers also one of the largest graduate schools.

In 2020, the EUI was ranked 31st in the world for Politics and International Studies, 51st in the world for History, and 51st in the world for Law in the QS World University Rankings.

The EUI Political and Social Science department was ranked 1st in Europe and 5th worldwide in the Hix ranking of such departments (which was published in 2004 and covered the period 1998–2002). In November 2009, the same department was included in the Die Zeit 'CHE Excellence Ranking' for political science.

Campus

The European University Institute is seated on the Tuscan hillside overlooking Florence and close to Fiesole. Many of the villas date from the Renaissance period and have been restored along with their landscaped gardens.

Organisation
The main bodies are the Academic Council, the Research Council, the Budgetary Committee and the High Council (composed of the Member State delegates). The president of the institute is Professor Renaud Dehousse, who is assisted in his duties by the institute's secretary general, Marco Del Panta.

Strategic Standing Committee
The Strategic Standing Committee for 2020 is composed by:

 The Troika: Luxembourg (chair), Latvia and Malta
 Italy
 Netherlands
 Ireland
 A European Parliament Representative, ex officio, Ricardo Ribera D’Alcala, Director General, Internal Policies
 A European Commission Representative, ex officio, Stefaan Hermans, Director, Policy Strategy and Evaluation
 External Expert: Howard Newby, Immediate Past Vice-Chancellor, University of Liverpool
 External Expert: Alberto Felice De Toni, Presidente Fondazione CRUI, Conferenza dei Rettori delle Università Italiane
 The President of the EUI, Professor Renaud Dehousse, member without voting rights

Institutional and research publications
Corporate publications produced by the EUI include:

 The President's Annual Report
 The Doctoral Programme
 Annual Directory of EUI Academic Publications

The EUI Research Repository (Cadmus, EUI Research Repository) contains the academic publications by the members of the EUI, with open-access, full text-versions of publications (working papers, books, contributions to books, e-Books, articles, and theses).

Alumni
Many researchers who have taken doctorates at the EUI are employed as professors in leading universities, officials in European Institutions and international organizations, or hold positions in government administration. Approximately one third of EUI alumni work in a country other than their own.

Former presidents

Max Kohnstamm, Netherlands
Werner Maihofer, Germany
Émile Noël, France
Patrick Masterson, Ireland
Yves Mény, France
Josep Borrell Fontelles, Spain
Marise Cremona, United Kingdom
Joseph Weiler, United States

Notable former faculty

Philip Alston, Law
Giuliano Amato, Law
Jean Blondel, Political science
Gisela Bock, History
Kirti N. Chaudhuri, History
Carlo Cipolla, History
Colin Crouch, Sociology
Maurice Cranston, Political philosophy
 Donatella della Porta, Sociology
Gøsta Esping-Andersen, Sociology
Sergio Fabbrini, Political science
Peter Flora, Sociology
Klaus Hopt, Law
Søren Johansen, Economics
Steven Lukes, Political philosophy
Peter Mair, Political science
Giandomenico Majone, Political science
Alan S. Milward, History
Michael Keating, Political science
Thomas Risse, International Relations
Giovanni Sartori, Political science
Philippe C. Schmitter, Political science
Andrew Shonfield, Economics
Susan Strange, Political economy
Gunther Teubner, Law
Neil Walker, Law
Joseph Weiler, Law
Jay Winter, History
Christian Reus-Smit, International Relations

Notable alumni

 Manuel Perez-Garcia, Spanish Associate Professor at Shanghai Jiao Tong University (China) and ERC Grantee 2015
 Catherine Barnard, British legal scholar
 Srđan Cvijić, Serbian political scientist
 Maurice Glasman, British political scientist
 Simon Hix, British political scientist at the London School of Economics
 Jonathan Hopkin, British political scientist
 John Loughlin, Professor at the University of Cambridge
 Peter Mair, Professor of Political Science at Leiden University and the EUI
 Frank Schimmelfennig, Swiss political scientist
 Nuno Severiano Teixeira, Portuguese scholar, Minister of Defense
 Joachim Wuermeling, German politician
 Martin Westlake, British, Secretary-General of the European Economic and Social Committee
 Mishal Husain, British, BBC World
 Marta Cartabia, Italian, Former President of the Italian Constitutional Court
 Marco Doria, Italian, Mayor of the city of Genoa
 Brigitte Granville, French, Professor at Queen Mary University of London
 Tiago C. Peixoto, Brazilian political scientist at the World Bank.

References

External links

 European University Institute (EUI)
 Robert Schuman Centre for Advanced Studies
 Max Weber Programme
 EUI Library

 
Intergovernmental organizations established by treaty
Intergovernmental universities
International universities
International research institutes
Social science institutes
Universities created by intergovernmental organizations
Educational institutions established in 1972
Universities established in the 1970s